Poljubinj is a settlement east of Tolmin in the Littoral region of Slovenia.

Geography

Podljubinj is located on a terrace above the left bank of the Tolminka River, a tributary of the Soča River.

Cultural heritage
Poljubinj is known for egg decoration during the local šempav holiday, which is named after the former Saint Paul's Church on Žabče Peak and is celebrated on the first Sunday in May. Eggs are colored red, and verses and designs are written and painted on them.

References

External links
Poljubinj on Geopedia

Populated places in the Municipality of Tolmin